Museum Fodor is a former art museum in Amsterdam in the Netherlands. The museum was located at the Keizersgracht in Amsterdam-Centrum in the building that currently houses the Foam Fotografiemuseum Amsterdam.

The museum was opened in 1863. The museum was dissolved in 1993. Fodor's collection is now managed by the Amsterdam Museum.

History 

The monumental building on the Keizersgracht canal has a history going back to Carel Joseph Fodor (1801–1860), who worked in the coal trading business. Carel Fodor first bought the Keizersgracht 611. Later he also bought the adjacent warehouse and residential house.

Fodor started to collect paintings, drawings and prints from 1834 onwards. His preference went out to contemporary art, works by 'living masters'. Fodor quickly opened up his house to the general public, where many art lovers visited to see his collection by appointment.

When Fodor died, he bequeathed his collection to the city of Amsterdam. He also left behind a large sum of money to turn his house into a museum. Fodor destined Keizersgracht 609, the warehouse, in his testament as the exhibition space that should receive the name Museum Fodor. It should become a permanent exhibition space for his personal collection.

In 1863, Museum Fodor opened its doors as the first museum of modern art. In the early years the museum attracted a large number of visitors, but as the years passed by these numbers dwindled.

In 1948 the collection was stored in a depot and the museum became a separate location of the Stedelijk Museum. In 1963 the complete collection was taken over by the Amsterdams Historisch Museum.

Museum Fodor was dissolved on 1 January 1993.

Building 

Museum Fodor was located at Keizersgracht 609 near the Leidsestraat in the center of the canal district in the borough Amsterdam-Centrum.

The museum building was originally a canal-side warehouse. In 1860, it was owned by Carel Joseph Fodor. In 1861–62, after Fodor's death, the building was turned into a museum by a design of architect Cornelis Outshoorn. The building was elevated with an Italianate facade, made of sandstone, with a straight cornice.

The building has been a rijksmonument (national heritage site) since 1970.

Since 2001, the Foam Fotografiemuseum Amsterdam is located here.

Collection 
The collection of Museum Fodor consisted of the large collection of paintings, prints, and drawings that Carel Joseph Fodor bequeathed to the city of Amsterdam. Among the paintings was Christus Consolator (1837) by Ary Scheffer, which Fodor had bought from the collection of the Duchess of Orléans. The museum acquired the Atlas Splitgerber in 1879 and a collection of works by Jan and Caspar Luyken in 1889.

From 1948, the collection was no longer on display in Museum Fodor. The paintings were moved to the Stedelijk Museum Amsterdam, the prints and drawings to the Rijksmuseum and the Atlas Splitgerber to the Amsterdam City Archives. Since 1963, Fodor's collection is managed by the Amsterdams Historisch Museum.

References

External links 

 
 Museum Fodor/FOAM with photos (Dutch)
 

1863 establishments in the Netherlands
1994 disestablishments in the Netherlands
Art museums and galleries in the Netherlands
Defunct art museums and galleries
Art museums established in 1863
Art museums disestablished in 1994
Defunct museums in the Netherlands
Museums in Amsterdam
19th-century architecture in the Netherlands